The following Union Army units and commanders fought in the Battle of Wauhatchie of the American Civil War. The Confederate order of battle is listed separately. Order of battle compiled from the casualty returns and the reports.

Abbreviations used

Military rank
 MG = Major General
 BG = Brigadier General
 Col = Colonel
 Ltc = Lieutenant Colonel
 Maj = Major
 Cpt = Captain
 Lt = Lieutenant

Other
 w = wounded
 mw = mortally wounded
 k = killed

Hooker's Command
MG Joseph Hooker

 Chief of Staff: MG Daniel Butterfield

XI Corps

MG Oliver O. Howard

XII Corps

References

Further reading
 U.S. War Department, The War of the Rebellion: a Compilation of the Official Records of the Union and Confederate Armies, U.S. Government Printing Office, 1880–1901.

American Civil War orders of battle